Kittanning coal refers to coal seams in the Kittanning cyclothem of the Pennsylvanian Epoch, located in southeastern Ohio. 

In the coal industry, the Lower Kittanning is Coal number 5, and the Middle Kittanning is Coal number 6.

History
These were and are economically important coal seams in the Appalachia region of Ohio. The Middle Kittanning is at about surface level in the valleys of Monday Creek and Sunday Creek in southeastern Ohio, but become much deeper going east.  

Many towns and villages in southeast Ohio grew up around the mining of the Middle Kittanning coal vein.  Many of these are known as the "Little Cities of Black Diamonds."

References

Coal mining in Appalachia
Geologic formations of Ohio 
Mining in Ohio
Appalachian culture in Ohio
Carboniferous Ohio 
Carboniferous System of North America
Pennsylvanian North America